Springfield railway station was a small station on the Ashover Light Railway and it served the western area of Clay Cross in North East Derbyshire, England. The station consisted of nothing more than a nameboard at a point where the line was crossed by a footpath. After closure in 1950 the site was demolished and nothing remains of the station or trackbed.

References

Disused railway stations in Derbyshire
Railway stations opened in 1925
Railway stations closed in 1950
Former London, Midland and Scottish Railway stations